The 2018 Judo Grand Prix Tbilisi was held at the Tbilisi Sports Palace in Tbilisi, Georgia, from 30 March to 1 April 2018.

Medal summary

Men's events

Women's events

Source Results

Medal table

References

External links
 

2018 IJF World Tour
2018 Judo Grand Prix
Judo
Grand Prix 2018
Judo